Waterloo United Methodist Church is a historic United Methodist church located at Waterloo in Seneca County, New York.  It was constructed in 1895 and is a brick and stone church with vernacular Romanesque / Greek Revival style design and decorative detail.  It features an  tripartite tower, crowned by a tall steeple.

It was listed on the National Register of Historic Places in 2004.

References

External links
Guide to the First Methodist Episcopal Church Of Waterloo Records, 1843-1872 (Collection Number: 6041), Division of Rare and Manuscript Collections, Cornell University Library
Official Waterloo United Methodist Church Website
Food Pantry Mission

Churches on the National Register of Historic Places in New York (state)
United Methodist churches in New York (state)
Churches completed in 1895
19th-century Methodist church buildings in the United States
Churches in Seneca County, New York
National Register of Historic Places in Seneca County, New York
Waterloo, New York